Hermann Becht (19 March 1939, Karlsruhe – 12 February 2009, Marxzell) was a German operatic bass-baritone. He notably portrayed the role of Alberich in the 1983 recording of Richard Wagner's The Ring Cycle which won a Grammy Award for Best Opera Recording.
He also portrayed Alberich in the centennial Ring under conductor Pierre Boulez, directed by Patrice Chéreau in 1980.

References
Bayreuther Festspiele. Hermann Becht 
Cummings, David (ed.) (2000). ""Becht, Hermann", International Who's Who in Classical Music, p. 45. Routledge. 
Der Standard (13 February 2009). "Opernsänger Hermann Becht gestorben" (obituary). 
Hochschule für Musik Karlsruhe. Hermann Becht

External links
Hermann Becht on WorldCat
Alberich.  YouTube.

Operatic bass-baritones
1939 births
2009 deaths
20th-century German male opera singers
Musicians from Karlsruhe